The Embassy of Ukraine in Minsk is the diplomatic mission of Ukraine in Belarus.

History 
Diplomatic relations between Ukraine and Belarus established December 27, 1991. Embassy of Ukraine in Belarus was launched June 30, 1992.

Embassy House opened December 1, 2000 by the President of Ukraine Leonid Kuchma, Prime Minister of Ukraine Viktor Yushchenko, Ukraine's Foreign Minister Anatoliy Zlenko and Prime Minister of Belarus Vladimir Yermoshin and Deputy Prime Minister of the Republic Belarus - Foreign Minister of Belarus Mikhail Khvostov.

Ukraine opened a Consulate General in Brest.

Previous Ambassadors

 Volodymyr Zheliba (1992-1998)
 Noah Goren (2002-)
 Anatoly Dron (1998-2003)
 Petro Shapoval (2003-2005)
 Valentyn Nalyvaichenko (2005-2006)
 Ihor Likhovy (2006-2010)
 Roman Bezsmertnyi (2010-2011)
 Viktor Tykhonov (2011 - 2012)
 Viktor Yakubov (2012-2013), Chargé d'Affaires ad interim
 Mykhailo Yezhel (2013-2015)
 Valery Dzhyhun (2015-), Chargé d'Affaires ad interim
 Ihor Kyzym (2017-)

See also 
 Ukraine–Belarus relations
 Foreign relations of Belarus
 Foreign relations of Ukraine
 Embassy of Belarus in Kyiv
 List of diplomatic missions of Ukraine

References

External links 
 Embassy of Ukraine in Minsk
 Consulate General of Ukraine in Brest

Minsk
Ukraine
Belarus–Ukraine relations